Welcome II Nextasy the second studio album by American R&B trio Next. It was released by Arista Records on June 20, 2000 in the United States where it reached gold status.

Critical reception

AllMusic editor John Bush found that while "there's no breakout hit the quality of "Too Close," Next's sophomore album Welcome II Nextasy is smoother and features a better overall production than their debut. The trio's version of hip-hop-soul is just as explicit as before; from "Cybersex" to "Let's Make a Movie" to "Banned from TV," Next proves themselves the Barry White of the '90s." Billboard remarked that "working again with Naughty By Nature's KayGee and others, Next goes for more originality vs. samples and tackles subjects both provocative and real [...] Those who like their R&B/hip-hop naughty – but still nice – won't be disappointed."

Track listing

Sample credits
"What U Want" features samples from "Holdin' Out (For Your Love)" as originally performed by Rhythm Heritage.
"Jerk" contains an interpolation of "Ego Trippin" as written by Ultramagnetic MCs.

Charts

Weekly charts

Year-end charts

Certifications

References

2000 albums
Next (American band) albums
Arista Records albums